"The Rhythm of Life" is a song from the 1966 Broadway musical Sweet Charity, written by composer Cy Coleman and lyricist Dorothy Fields.

In the musical, the song is performed by the character Big Daddy, the leader of an alternative "hippie" religious group/cult called the "Rhythm of Life Church." In the 1969 movie musical adaptation of Sweet Charity, directed by Bob Fosse (who also directed the original Broadway production), the song is performed by Sammy Davis, Jr., who co-stars as Big Daddy in the film.

The same year as the release of the Sweet Charity film, Diana Ross & the Supremes and The Temptations covered the song for their G.I.T. on Broadway television special, originally broadcast November 12, 1969 on NBC with a soundtrack album released a few days earlier on November 7. Their version was released as a single in 1970 in Australia and New Zealand, where it was a top 5 and top 20 hit, respectively.

Track listing

Australia

New Zealand

Charts

Weekly charts

Year-end charts

References

Songs from musicals
The Supremes songs
1966 songs
1970 singles
Motown singles
Songs with lyrics by Dorothy Fields
Songs with music by Cy Coleman